The 2018–19 National First Division was the season from August 2018 to May 2019 of South Africa's second tier of professional soccer, the National First Division. Stellenbosch FC were crowned champions on the final day, following a 0–0 draw with Maccabi FC.

League table

Play-offs

References

External links
PSL.co.za

National First Division seasons
South
2018–19 in South African soccer leagues